NOU or Nou may refer to:

Education 
 Nalanda Open University, Patna, Bihar, India
 National Open University, Taiwan
 North Orissa University, Baripada, Orissa, India

Places 
 Camp Nou, a football stadium in Barcelona, Catalonia, Spain
 La Tontouta International Airport, Nouméa, New Caledonia (IATA airport code: NOU)
 Nou, Iran, a village in Gilan Province, Iran
 Nō, Niigata, a former town in Japan
 Nō Station, Itoigawa, Niigata Prefecture, Japan
 Nou, Sibiu, a village in Roșia, Sibiu, Romania
 Nou Român, a village in Arpașu de Jos, Sibiu, Romania
 Nou Săsesc, a village in Laslea, Sibiu, Romania

Other uses
 Noh, a major form of classical Japanese musical drama
 Norwegian Official Report
 Enn Nõu (born 1933), Estonian writer
 Ewage language (ISO 639: nou), spoken in Papua New Guinea

See also 
 NOH (disambiguation)
 Nô (disambiguation)